The 1988 All Japan Sports Prototype Car Endurance Championship was the sixth season of the All Japan Sports Prototype Championship. The 1988 champion was the #27 From A Racing Porsche 962C driven by Hideki Okada.

Schedule
All races were held in Japan.

Entry list
 For the WEC-Japan event, JSPC teams used different car numbers to avoid conflicts with the car numbers of the entrants of the World Sportscar Championship; each car's WEC-Japan race number is displayed in tooltips.

Season results
Season results as follows:

Point Ranking

Drivers

Makes

References

External links
 1988 全日本スポーツプロトタイプカー耐久選手権 

JSPC seasons
JSPC